The 2021 Valencian Community motorcycle Grand Prix (officially known as the Gran Premio Motul de la Comunitat Valenciana) was the eighteenth and final round of the 2021 Grand Prix motorcycle racing season. It was held at the Circuit Ricardo Tormo in Valencia on 14 November 2021. It was also the final Grand Prix for Valentino Rossi who retired after the season.

In the MotoGP class, Ducati Lenovo Team secured the Teams' Championship, its first since  by making possible the first podium lock-up for Ducati in the MotoGP history with Francesco Bagnaia winning the race ahead of fellow Ducati riders Jorge Martín, who later became Rookie of the Year, and Jack Miller.

In the Moto2 class, Remy Gardner won the Riders' Championship. Remy and his father Wayne became the second father-son World Champions after Kenny Roberts and Kenny Roberts Jr.

In the Moto3 class, KTM secured its fifth Constructors' Championship and its first since .

Qualifying

MotoGP

 
 Pol Espargaró was declared unfit to compete after a crash in free practice.

Race

MotoGP

 Pol Espargaró was declared unfit to compete after a crash in free practice.

Moto2
The race, scheduled to be run for 25 laps, was red-flagged due to a first-lap accident involving multiple riders and the resulting oil spill. The race was later restarted over 16 laps with the original starting grid.

 Simone Corsi entered the pits at the end of the warm-up lap due to a mechanical problem.

Moto3

 Andi Farid Izdihar was declared unfit to compete after a crash in free practice.

Championship standings after the race
Below are the standings for the top five riders, constructors, and teams after the round.

MotoGP

Riders' Championship standings

Constructors' Championship standings

Teams' Championship standings

Moto2

Riders' Championship standings

Constructors' Championship standings

Teams' Championship standings

Moto3

Riders' Championship standings

Constructors' Championship standings

Teams' Championship standings

Notes

References

External links

Valencia
Valencian Community motorcycle Grand Prix
Valencian Community motorcycle Grand Prix
21st century in Valencia
Valencian Community motorcycle Grand Prix